Scaevola platyphylla, commonly known as broad-leaved fanflower, is a shrub in the family Goodeniaceae. It is endemic to the south-west of Western Australia. Plants grow to between 0.3 and 1.3 metres high and have blue to purple flowers that appear between August and January in their native range.

The species was formally described in 1839 by English botanist John Lindley in A sketch of the vegetation of the Swan River Colony.

Gallery

References

platyphylla
Eudicots of Western Australia
Asterales of Australia
Taxa named by John Lindley
Plants described in 1839